Hazel Wolf High School was a private, Waldorf high school located at the south end of Seattle's Queen Anne neighborhood, having moved there from the Roosevelt district. It opened in September 1999 after five years of planning, and merged with Seattle Waldorf School in 2007.

References

Educational institutions established in 1999
High schools in King County, Washington
Schools in Seattle
Waldorf schools in the United States
Defunct schools in Washington (state)
1999 establishments in Washington (state)
2007 disestablishments in Washington (state)
Educational institutions disestablished in 2007